Araz Naxçıvan is a futsal club based in Nakhchivan City, Azerbaijan. The club is very dominant in Azeri futsal, as they won ten consecutive Premier League titles from 2004 to 2014.

Araz is one of the strongest teams in Europe, having reached UEFA Futsal Cup semi finals two times.

History

Araz Naxçivan founded in 2004 to replace a defunct football club in Azerbaijan Premier League and have dominated futsal in Azerbaijan ever since.

The team made their UEFA Futsal Cup debut in 2005, picking up four points from three first qualifying round games but the following season they reached the Elite round.

Araz reached semi-finals in the UEFA Futsal Cup in 2010 but lost out to Interviú FS. However, clinched third place after winning in penalties against Luparense. The club's players and coach Alesio, constituted the major part of the Azerbaijan squad that made their UEFA European Futsal Championship debut in 2010, reaching the semi-finals in Hungary.

In 2014, the club repeated their success by gaining third place in UEFA Futsal Cup.

Honours

National
Source:
15 Premier League : 2005, 2006, 2007, 2008, 2009, 2010, 2011, 2012, 2013, 2014, 2016, 2017, 2018, 2019, 2020
14 Futsal Cup : 2005, 2006, 2007, 2008, 2009, 2010, 2011, 2012, 2013, 2014, 2016, 2017, 2018, 2019

International
UEFA Futsal Cup:
3rd place (2): 2010, 2014

Current squad

Notable players
  Andrey Tveryankin
  Serjão
  Rizvan Farzaliyev
  Thiago Paz
  Vitaliy Borisov
  Biro Jade
   Marko Perić
    Adriano Foglia
   Kristjan Čujec
  Matej Klár

UEFA Club Competitions record
Appearances: 16

Summary

References

External links
 Club's Profile at the uefa.com 

Futsal clubs in Azerbaijan
Futsal clubs established in 2004
2004 establishments in Azerbaijan